Hyposhada is a genus of moths in the family Erebidae erected by George Hampson in 1909. Its only species, Hyposhada pellopis, was first described by George Thomas Bethune-Baker in 1908. It is found in Australia, where it has been recorded from Queensland.

References

External links

Lithosiina
Monotypic moth genera
Moths described in 1908
Moths of Australia